Nikolske Raion, until May 2016 Volodarske Raion, was one of the raions of Donetsk Oblast, located in southwestern Ukraine. The administrative center of the raion was the urban-type settlement of Nikolske. The raion was abolished on 18 July 2020 as part of the administrative reform of Ukraine, which reduced the number of raions of Donetsk Oblast to eight, of which only five were controlled by the government. The area of the former Nikolske Raion was merged into Mariupol Raion.

On 21 May 2016, Verkhovna Rada adopted decision to rename Volodarske Raion to Nikolske Raion according to the law prohibiting names of Communist origin. The raion center, Volodarske, was previously renamed to Nikolske.

Population 
Ethnic groups in the raion, according to the 2001 Ukrainian Census:

References

Former raions of Donetsk Oblast
1925 establishments in Ukraine
Ukrainian raions abolished during the 2020 administrative reform